Zhuhai railway station, also known as Gongbei station, is an elevated station of the Guangzhou–Zhuhai intercity railway (Guangzhu ICR). It is located in the Gongbei Subdistrict (jiedao) of Xiangzhou in Zhuhai, Guangdong, China, besides the Gongbei Port and parallel to the border between mainland China and Macau. The station is the southern terminus of the Guangzhou–Zhuhai intercity railway and the northern terminus of the Zhuhai–Zhuhai Airport intercity railway.

History
The station entered service on 31 December 2012, behind its target completion date of 31 July 2012, opening alongside three other stations that extended the line to downtown Zhuhai from the temporary terminus at the Zhuhai North railway station.

China Railway announced that a train service between Beijing West and Zhuhai would enter service since 27 November 2015. As the first interprovincial train from Zhuhai, this train ran as D923 from Beijing to Zhuhai, and D924 on the return trip.

The station was expanded to accommodate the Zhuhai–Zhuhai Airport intercity railway, which began operations on 18 August 2020.

References

Railway stations in Guangdong
Zhuhai
Railway stations in China opened in 2012